Adam Foroughi is an Iranian-American billionaire businessman and the chief executive officer (CEO) of AppLovin, a mobile technology company.

Biography
Born in 1980, Foroughi's family emigrated to the United States to escape the destruction caused by Iraq-Iran War. Adam grew up in Los Angeles, California, where his father has a successful construction company. He studied at the University of California, Berkeley, earning a B.A. in economics. Upon graduating from Berkeley, Foroughi worked as a derivatives trader. Later, he founded two marketing companies before starting AppLovin.

In 2012, Foroughi co-founded AppLovin along with friends John Krystynak and Andrew Karam.

On April 15, 2021, AppLovin became a public company after an initial public offering (IPO), with a total valuation of approximately $24 billion. As a result of AppLovin's successful IPO, Foroughi's net worth rose to an estimated $2 billion.

Adam is married and has 5 children.

References

1980 births
American chief executives
American billionaires
Iranian emigrants to the United States
Living people
University of California, Berkeley alumni